Stephen White is the name of:

 Stephen White (author) (born 1951), author of thriller fiction best known for his Dr. Alan Gregory series
 Stephen White (Gaelic footballer) (1928–2009), Gaelic footballer from Ireland
 Stephen White (hurler) (born 1988), Irish hurler
 Stephen White (Jesuit) (1574–1646), Jesuit author
 Stephen White (political scientist) (born 1945), Stephen Leonard White, British political scientist
 Stephen White (priest) (born 1958), Irish priest
 Stephen White (television writer), television and children's book writer
 Stephen H. White, professor of physiology and biophysics
 Stephen K. White (born 1949), American political theorist at the University of Virginia
 Stephen M. White (1853–1901), U.S. Senator from California
 Stephen V. White (1831–1913), U.S. congressman from New York
 Stephen William White (1840–1914), secretary of the Northern Central Railway and translator of Jules Verne's novels

See also
Steve White (disambiguation)
Steven White (disambiguation)
Stephen Whyte (disambiguation)